Joel Ângelo Couto Ferreiro Vital, known as Joel Vital (born 7 December 1987) is a Portuguese football player who plays for Sporting Covilhã.

Club career
He made his professional debut in the Segunda Liga for Sporting Covilhã on 11 August 2013 in a game against Marítimo B.

References

1987 births
Living people
Footballers from Porto
Portuguese footballers
S.C. Salgueiros players
CD Candal players
C.D. Cinfães players
S.C. Covilhã players
Liga Portugal 2 players
Association football defenders